Inspector Chingum is an Indian 3D animated television series produced by Cosmos-Maya that premiered on 4 May 2018, on Amazon Prime Video. It is a spin-off of the show Motu Patlu.

Inspector Chingum was Cosmos-Maya's second show which premiered on online platforms before television channels, the first being Selfie with Bajrangi.

The show was televised on Hungama TV from 29 April 2019. Later it also aired on Marvel HQ and Disney Channel.

The series has 52 episodes across 2 seasons.

Characters 
 Inspector Chingum – He is the police inspector of the district 'Shantiwood'. He has a strong south Indian accent. He is often seen riding a bike. He loves his job and is a strict but extremely kind fellow. He is seen wearing a Khaki uniform for work.
 Hera and Pheri – They are the two cowardly constables who just handcuff the thieves after Inspector Chingum catches them. At times Pheri is seen to have a weak memory. This can be seen when he calls different restaurants and orders different dishes instead of ordering dosa from dosa Anna. They both wear Khaki uniforms.
 Khabrilaal – He is a friend of Inspector Chingum and can talk to animals and birds. He often helps Inspector Chingum via his agents that are spread all throughout the city.  
 No baal – He is the local and main villain of the show who invades Shantiwood. He owns an institute named Crime University that train and turn people into professional criminals. He is often seen to have an intense amount of hatred for Shantiwood and Inspector Chingum and will do anything to get rid of them. 
 Ek baal - He is one of the three most trusted goons of No Baal. He is the shortest among the three, but also the most clever and talkative one as well. He wears a red outfit consisting of a red shirt and pajama.
 Do baal - He is another one of the three most trusted goons of No Baal. He is more taller than Ek Baal but is shorter than Teen Baal. He wears a green outfit consisting of a green shirt and pajama.
 Teen Baal - He is the tallest goon among the three most trusted goons of No Baal. He wears a blue outfit consisting of a blue shirt and pajama. He's often ignored and has the least importance among the three. 
 Bozo - He is Inspector Chingum's pet dog and police dog as well. He's very intelligent and has proven himself to have an excellent physique. This is seen when in an episode, he becomes the goalkeeper for Shantiwood's football team. 
 Dosa Anna - He is the man who helps Chingum at times when he's totally overwhelmed by his opponent. He cooks various types of dosa and sends it to Inspector Chingum. This gives him the power (super powers) to fight criminals. 
 Dr. Bigadu - He is an evil scientist, much like the evil counterpart of Chatur, who works for No Baal. He often invents such things that wreak havoc in Shantiwood.
 Superstar Chocolate - He is the superstar of Shantiwood and a great friend to Inspector Chingum. He often enters the scene with dances and it at times helps Chingum to get past tough villains. 
 Chatur - He is a friend of Inspector Chingum. He's a scientist, and he often helps Chingum by inventing really helpful things and by fixing things related to technology like finding out spy cameras, fixing robots etc. 
 Mayor Jaldbole - She is Shantiwood's mayor. She does everything very slowly. Also anyone or anything who listens to her speaking slows down.  
 Justick - He is Inspector Chingum's stick that's alive. He often gives valuable advice to Inspector Chingum when he's in trouble although it is in the form of proverbs.

Locations
 Shantiwood – It is the district where all the characters live. It is a valley with 7 hills that hold the letters to form the word 'SHANTIWOOD'. If there is something going bad it becomes 'ASHANTIWOOD'.The word A stands before Shantiwood
 Police office – It is made out of glass and oak wood. Its interiors show one room with a table and chair.
 Tirumala Apartments – This is where Inspector Chingum and his friend lives. Chigum's room is 302 and his friend's room is 301.
 City Centre – These buildings consist of a school, hospital, fire station, and a supermarket.

Episodes

See also 
List of Indian animated television series
Motu Patlu

References 

Motu Patlu
2018 Indian television series debuts
Indian children's animated television series
Indian television spin-offs
Amazon Prime Video children's programming
Animated television series by Amazon Studios
Hungama TV original programming
Fictional portrayals of police departments in India
Animated web series